Animawings  is a Romanian airline based at Henri Coandă International Airport in Bucharest. It specializes in charter operations.

History
In March 2020, it was announced Aegean Airlines had taken a 25% stake in the airline. The major part of the airline (75%) is owned by the Memento Group, a tour operator. In July 2020, the airline secured its Air Operating Certificate (OAC) and launched operations operating charter flights. In January 2021, the airline began selling tickets on its own website from 11 airports in Romania to destinations in Africa, Europe and Middle East.

In October 2021, Aegean Airlines increases its stake to 51%.

Destinations
Animawings operates scheduled flights to the following destinations:

Fleet
, the Animawings fleet consists of the following aircraft:

Animawings also plans to lease further aircraft from Aegean Airlines, such as the A321neo.

References 

Airlines of Romania
Airlines established in 2019
Charter airlines
Companies based in Bucharest
Romanian brands
2019 establishments in Romania